Burykhia hunti is a Precambrian fossil from the White Sea region of Russia dating to . It is considered of ascidian affinity, due to the sac-like morphology and a series of distinctly perforated bands reminiscent of a tunicate pharynx.  If B. hunti is a tunicate, it could be the oldest ascidian fossil known as of its publication in 2012. It is possibly related to the slightly younger Ausia, another putative ascidian from the Vendian biota in Namibia. In the case of Burykhia, the narrow longitudinal vessels support affinity with the suborder Phlebobranchia.

Burykhia does not appear to have been colonial.

See also
 List of Ediacaran genera

References

Ascidiacea
Tunicate genera
Prehistoric chordate genera
Ediacaran life
Precambrian fossils
Ediacaran Europe
White Sea fossils